The House of Blue Leaves is a 1987 television play adapted from the John Guare play of the same title.

Summary
The telefilm is set in Sunnyside, Queens in 1965, the day of Pope Paul VI's visit to New York City. The black comedy focuses on Artie Shaughnessy, a zookeeper who dreams of making it big in Hollywood as a songwriter, and his wife Bananas, a schizophrenic destined for the institution that provides the play's title. Artie wants to take his girlfriend Bunny with him to Hollywood. The story features nuns eager to see the Pope, a political bombing, and Ronnie, Artie's son, a GI headed for Vietnam who goes AWOL.

Cast and characters
Source:IMDB; tv.com

 Swoosie Kurtz – Bananas Shaughnessy
 John Mahoney – Artie
 Christine Baranski – Bunny Flingus
 Julie Hagerty – Corrinna Stroller
 Ben Stiller – Ronnie Shaughnessy
 Richard Portnow – Billy Einhorn
 Debra Cole – Little Nun
 Patricia Falkenhain – Head Nun
 Jane Cecil – Second Nun
 Ian Blackman – MP / El Dorado bartender
 Brian Evers – The White Man / El Dorado bartender

Production
The telefilm was directed by  Kirk Browning and Jerry Zaks, and was filmed on-stage before a live audience at the Plymouth Theatre. The telefilm was broadcast in May 1987 on the  PBS series American Playhouse.

References

External links
 

1987 films
1987 television films
American television films
Television shows based on plays
American Playhouse
1980s English-language films
Films directed by Kirk Browning